The Lloydieae were a tribe of monocotyledon perennial, herbaceous mainly bulbous flowering plants in the Liliaceae (Lily) family. The tribe was generally considered monogeric, being represented by the single genus Lloydia. But since that genus has at various times and is now considered to be part of the genus Gagea, and therefore in the tribe Lilieae, it was sometimes listed with both genera. Furthermore, many authorities place Gagea into a separate tribe, Tulipeae. It has also historically been considered to be a subtribe of the Lilieae. In 2013, Kim et al. proposed splitting off Gagea from the rest of Tulipeae by resurrecting the tribe Lloydieae.

See also 
 Taxonomy of Liliaceae

References

Bibliography 

 
  In 
 
 

 
 
 

Liliaceae
Monocot tribes
Historically recognized angiosperm taxa